A filming location is a place where some or all of a film or television series is produced, in addition to or instead of using sets constructed on a movie studio backlot or soundstage. In filmmaking, a location is any place where a film crew will be filming actors and recording their dialog. A location where dialog is not recorded may be considered a second unit photography site. Filmmakers often choose to shoot on location because they believe that greater realism can be achieved in a "real" place; however, location shooting is often motivated by the film's budget. Many films shoot interior scenes on a sound stage and exterior scenes on location.

Types of locations
There are two main types of locations:
 Location shooting, the practice of filming in an actual setting
 Studio shoots, on either a sound stage or back lot

History
Video cameras originally designed for television broadcast were large and heavy, mounted on special pedestals and wired to remote recorders in separate rooms. As technology improved, out-of-studio video recording was possible with compact video cameras and portable video recorders; a detachable recording unit could be carried to a shooting location. Although the camera itself was compact, the need for a separate recorder made on-location shooting a two-person job.

Substitute locations
It is common for films or television series to be set in one place, but filmed in another, usually for reasons of economy or convenience, but sometimes because the substitute location looks more historically appropriate.

Some substitute filming locations, and the corresponding film setting, include:

 Almería, Spain - Southwest USA (The Good, the Bad and the Ugly, as well as numerous other Spaghetti Westerns)
 Cadiz, Spain - Havana, Cuba (Die Another Day)
 Hawaii - West Africa (Tears of the Sun), Brazilian Amazon (The Rundown)
 Madrid, Soria, Spain - Moscow, Russia (Doctor Zhivago)
 Malta - Ancient Sparta (Troy); Ancient Rome (Gladiator); Rome, Beirut, Cyprus, Tel Aviv, Athens (Munich); Sweethaven (Popeye)
 Matera, Italy - Jerusalem in (The Passion of the Christ), (Mary Magdalene) and several Jesus-time movies
 Gran Sasso, Italy - Ladyhawke, Red Sonja, 60's Western movies
 Prague, Czech Republic - Medieval England (A Knight's Tale), Renaissance Italy (Borgia); 18th Century Vienna (Amadeus); 18th Century France (The Affair of the Necklace); 19th Century England (From Hell, Shanghai Knights); 19th Century Vienna (Wiener Mädeln, The Illusionist); WWII-era Dresden (Slaughterhouse-Five)
 St Pancras Hotel, London - Arkham Asylum, Gotham City (Batman Begins); Misselthwaite Manor, Yorkshire (The Secret Garden)
 Thailand - Various locations around Thailand have been used for many films depicting the Vietnam War era, including The Deer Hunter, The Killing Fields, Casualties of War, Air America and Operation Dumbo Drop.
 Woodstock, Illinois - Punxsutawney, Pennsylvania (Groundhog Day)

Image gallery

See also 
Location shooting
Location manager
Location scouting
Location library
Filmmaking

References

External links